Spirembolus levis is a species of sheet weaver found in Mexico and the United States. It was first described by Millidge in 1980.

References

Linyphiidae
Spiders of the United States
Spiders of Mexico
Spiders described in 1980